Crepipatella lingulata is a species of sea snail, a marine gastropod mollusk in the family Calyptraeidae.

References

Calyptraeidae
Gastropods described in 1846